Angelica Creek may refer to:

Angelica Creek (Georgia)
Angelica Creek (Pennsylvania)